Saint-Benoît, Quebec was a municipality in Quebec until its amalgamation with neighbouring towns in 1971 to form the town of Sainte-Scholastique, which was renamed Mirabel in 1973. The village was named after Saint Benedict of Nursia (in French, Benoît).

References

Communities in Laurentides